The Aikawa River  is located in the Miyagi Prefecture of Japan. The river drains about 11.6 km2. The length of the river is about 4.8 km. It drains to the Kitakami River. The river flows though Fujisawa Town and Ichinoseki City. It forms a boundary between Miyagi and Iwate prefectures. Aikawa Dam has been constructed in the river to use the flow of the river.

See also
List of rivers of Japan

References

Rivers of Japan